Julia Solis is a writer and photographer who investigates ruined urban spaces. She is the founder of two arts organizations: Dark Passage and Ars Subterranea, both of which are dedicated to exploring and exposing New York City ruins and underground spaces.

Solis wrote the book New York Underground and her photography book Stages of Decay (Prestel, 2013) shows abandoned American and European theaters. She is the executive producer of the film American Ruins.

Publications

Publications by Solis
Funeral Play. Artist book on wood veneer and video for Anthology Film Archives.
Scrub Station. Koja, 2006. . Short stories.
New York Underground: The Anatomy of a City. Routledge, 2007. .
Stages of Decay. Prestel, 2013. . Photographs.

Publications with others
Dead Rollers. Collaboration with Tom Kirsch for Proteus Gowanus.
Tales from the Sanatorium. Graphic novel in collaboration with Bryan Papciak and Ars Subterranea.
Irma. Collaboration with Tom Kirsch, Furnace Press.

Films
American Ruins – executive producer

See also
 Ruins photography
 Urban exploration

References

External links
New York Underground site
Photography at Underground Voices

Living people
Year of birth missing (living people)
American non-fiction writers
Urban exploration
American women photographers
21st-century American women